Charles Lamoureux (28 September 1834 – 21 December 1899) was a French conductor and violinist.

Life
He was born in Bordeaux, where his father owned a café. 
He studied the violin with Narcisse Girard at the Paris Conservatoire, taking a premier prix in 1854. 
He was subsequently engaged as a violinist at the Opéra de Paris and later joined the Société des Concerts du Conservatoire. 
In 1860, he was a co-founder of the Séances Populaires de Musique de Chambre and in 1872 he founded a quartet which eventually took on the proportions of a chamber orchestra.

Having journeyed to England and assisted at a Handel festival, he thought he would attempt something similar in Paris. Having come into a fortune through marriage, he put on the performances himself, leading to the foundation of the Société Française de l'Harmonie Sacrée. 
In 1873, Lamoureux conducted the first performance in Paris of Handel's Messiah. 
He also gave performances of Bach's St Matthew Passion, Handel's Judas Maccabaeus, Gounod's Gallia, and Massenet's Eve. As funds ran out, Lamoureux took up posts at the Opéra-Comique (1876) and the Paris Opéra (1877–1879) which were short-lived, due to Lamoureux's tendency to quarrel over their productions.

Lamoureux then drew up a contract with the Théâtre du Château d’Eau to give weekly symphony concerts. The Société des Nouveaux-Concerts (which became known as the Concerts Lamoureux) was directed by Lamoureux from 1881 until 1897, when he was succeeded by Camille Chevillard, his son-in-law. These concerts contributed greatly to popularizing Wagner's music in Paris.

In fact Lamoureux's advocacy of Wagner's music was untiring. 
When he gave the first French performance of Wagner's Lohengrin at the Eden-Théâtre in 1887, the Chauvinists held street demonstrations outside denouncing the performance as an unpatriotic act. 
Despite this setback, two years later the work was restaged at the Opéra. Lamoureux was successively second  at the Conservatoire, first  at the Opéra-Comique, and twice first  at the Opéra.

In 1893 Lamoureux made a tour of Russia. He visited London on several occasions, and gave successful concerts with his orchestra at the Queen's Hall, on one occasion sharing the stage with Sir Henry Wood and Wood's own orchestra. Lamoureux died at Paris in December 1899; Tristan und Isolde had been at last heard in Paris, owing to his initiative and under his direction. After conducting one of the performances of this masterpiece he was taken ill and succumbed in a few days, having had the consolation before his death of witnessing the triumph of the cause he had so courageously championed.

See also
 Berthe Marx

References

Attribution:

1834 births
1899 deaths
Musicians from Bordeaux
19th-century French male classical violinists
French conductors (music)
French male conductors (music)
Burials at Montmartre Cemetery
19th-century conductors (music)
Conservatoire de Paris alumni
Conservatoire de Bordeaux alumni
Chevaliers of the Légion d'honneur